The 2020–21 Moldovan National Division was the 30th season of top-tier football in Moldova. The season started on 3 July 2020 and ended on 26 May 2021. Sheriff Tiraspol were the defending champions. The winners of the league this season earned a spot in the first qualifying round of the 2021–22 UEFA Champions League, and the second, third and fourth placed clubs earned a place in the first qualifying round of the 2021–22 UEFA Europa Conference League.

Teams
A total of 10 teams competing in the league. These include 8 teams from the 2019 season and two promoted teams from the "A" Division: Florești and Dacia Buiucani, both making their debut in the top flight.

Managerial changes

League table

Results
Teams will play each other four times (twice at home, twice away).

Rounds 1−18

Rounds 19−36

Positions by round

Results by round
The following table represents the teams game results in each round.

Top goalscorers

Top assists

Clean sheets

Hat-tricks

Notes

References

External links
 Official website
 uefa.com

Moldovan Super Liga seasons
Moldova 1
Moldovan
2020–21 in Moldovan football